Pascal Demarthe (born 29 January 1960) is a French politician. He has served as a member of the National Assembly since 2014, representing Somme.

References

1960 births
Living people
People from Abbeville
Politicians from Hauts-de-France
Socialist Party (France) politicians
Deputies of the 14th National Assembly of the French Fifth Republic